Mary Page Marlowe is a play by Tracy Letts. Told out of chronological order, it follows the title character as played by six actresses and one doll. The play premiered in 2016.

The play opens with Mary, aged 40, telling her children that she is divorcing their father and moving from Dayton, Ohio, to Kentucky. Her past is subsequently shown, with Mary in conflict with her own mother. Later in life she deals with the fallout from three DUI convictions.

Mary Page Marlowe premiered in April 2016 at Chicago's Steppenwolf Theatre. Mary was played in the original production by Caroline Heffernan (age 12), Annie Munch (19), Carrie Coon (27, 36), Rebecca Spence (40, 44), Laura T. Fisher (50), and Blair Brown (59, 63, 69). In previews the infant Mary was played by three actual babies, but unease among the audience convinced director Anna D. Shapiro that using a doll would be less distracting.

Mary Page Marlowe opened Off-Broadway in New York City at the Tony Kiser Theater on July 12, 2018, in a production by the Second Stage Theater. Previews had started on June 19. Lila Neugebauer directed. In this production the title character was played by Brown (age 59,63, and 69), Emma Geer (age 19), Tatiana Maslany (age 27 and 36), Susan Pourfar (age 40 and 44), Mia Sinclair Jenness (age 12), and Kellie Overbey (age 50). Other members of the cast included Audrey Corsa, Grace Gummer, Brian Kerwin, and Gary Wilmes. The play's run was extended to August 19, running a week longer than originally planned.

References

2016 plays
Plays by Tracy Letts